The Volkswagen Touareg is a car produced by German automaker Volkswagen Group since 2002 at the Volkswagen Bratislava Plant. A five-seater mid-size luxury crossover SUV, the vehicle was named after the nomadic Tuareg people, inhabitants of the Saharan interior in North Africa. The vehicles were designed as unibody SUVs with independent suspensions. The initial generation (2002–2010) offered five-, six-, eight-, ten- and twelve-cylinder engine choices depending on choice.

Development
The Volkswagen Touareg (internally designated Typ 7L) was developed as a joint venture project by Porsche and the Volkswagen Group, involving the Audi and Volkswagen brands. At the time of Typ 7L development and for the first several years of production, Porsche was independently owned and not yet a part of the Volkswagen group. The sports car market fluctuates, and Porsche CEO Wendelin Wiedeking was looking to expand into new segments; this included marketing its first four-door vehicle. A team in Weissach, Germany, of over 300, led by Klaus-Gerhard Wolpert, developed the Volkswagen Group PL71 platform. Now it is shared between the Touareg, the Audi Q7, and the Porsche Cayenne. However, there are styling, equipment, performance, and technical differences between them. The Touareg and Cayenne both seat five, while the Q7's stretched wheelbase accommodates a third row for seven passengers. 

The Volkswagen Touareg is built at the Volkswagen Bratislava Plant in Bratislava, Slovakia, alongside the Audi Q7. The Cayenne is assembled by Porsche in Leipzig, Germany, at a facility built for Cayenne production.  

Due to the demand and the exchange rates of euros against the US dollar, as well as different pricing and environmental policies in the US, the V6 and V8 engine variants make up most of Volkswagen's American Touareg offering. Compared to other Volkswagen-branded vehicles sold in the US, which are aimed at the mass market, Touaregs came in more upscale trims and competed with other luxury crossover SUVs.

First generation (7L; 2002)

The Touareg comes as standard with a 4motion four-wheel drive system. It has an automatic progressively locking centre differential (with manual override) and a "low range" setting that can be activated with in-cabin controls. The Touareg featured an optional 4-wheel active air suspension, which can raise the ride height on command, and a locking rear differential to increase off-road capability. A rare option was a front-locking differential.

Engines

W12 (2005–2010)
The 6.0-litre double overhead camshaft (DOHC), 48-valve W12 engine version was initially intended to be a limited-edition model, with just 500 units planned to be produced; around 330 were slated for sale in Saudi Arabia, with the remainder sold in Europe. Some of those W12 Touaregs were sold in China, but the number sold is unknown. No sales were made in the United States. Eventually, the W12 model became an ordinary model without any production restrictions. It is estimated to reach  in 5.9 seconds.

V10 TDI (2002–2008)
The V10 TDI was offered in the United States for a limited time in 2004, but emissions regulations forced it off the market temporarily.

The V10 TDI returned to the U.S. market as a 2006 model-year vehicle in five states. Later US models went on sale in 2006, which was compliant with 50 states emission with Ultra-low sulphur diesel and particulate filter.  Stricter California Air Resources Board (CARB) emissions standards resulted in the V10 TDI being reduced to only 43 state emissions in 2008 before being cancelled again in the United States. The V10 engine was replaced by a V6 TDI engine that met the CARB minimum emission requirements for the 2009 model year.

Fifth Gear used this version for testing to tow a Boeing 747.

Facelift (2006-2010)

The Touareg's first facelift was unveiled at the 2006 Paris Motor Show, with its North American debut at the 2007 New York Auto Show as a 2008 model. It now features the shield grille styling shared with other vehicles in the Volkswagen range. The updated Touareg has more than 2300 redesigned parts and boasts some new technological features:
ABS Plus, which works in conjunction with the traction control system and shortens the braking distance by up to 25% on loose surfaces;
Front Scan, an adaptive cruise control system which can slow or even stop the car depending on traffic conditions;
Side Scan, a blind-spot monitor: it uses radar at the rear of the car to sense another car's presence and causes light-emitting diodes (LEDs) built into the wing mirrors to flash. If the driver indicates to move out, the LEDs flash at an accelerated rate to warn the driver until the other vehicle moves out of the Touareg's field of vision.

The 2007 Touareg, alongside an already lengthy options list, could be equipped with a driving dynamics package, a rollover sensor, a 620-watt Dynaudio sound system, and redesigned comfort seats. All diesel versions now have the diesel particulate filter standard.

In the US and Canada, the face-lifted Touareg was marketed as the Touareg 2 for the 2008–2010 model years, reverting to simply Touareg in 2011.

R50 (2007–2010)

The Touareg R50 is the third Volkswagen after the Golf and Passat to be given the 'R' treatment by Volkswagen Individual GmbH. The R50 global launch was at the 2007 Australian International Motor Show.

The R50 came standard with 21-inch Omanyt wheels, sport-tuned air suspension, decorative 'engine spin' finish interior trim inlays, and an optional four-zone Climatronic climate control system.

V6 TDI (2007–2010)
With this engine, the Touareg can reach  from a standstill in 8.3 seconds.

V6 TDI Clean Diesel (2009–2016)
The V6 TDI Clean Diesel featuring Selective Catalytic Reduction (SCR) system replaced the V10 TDI in US and Canada. The Touareg contains a  tank in the rear of the vehicle underneath the spare tyre, which stores the AdBlue solution. It is estimated that this tank will need to be replenished every . The Touareg does not include the NOX storage catalyst found in Jetta Clean Diesel TDI due to its heavy weight.

The Touareg BlueTDI was unveiled at the 2007 Geneva Motor Show. The production version of the V6 TDI Clean Diesel was unveiled at the 2008 LA Auto Show.

Sander Kuiken, Technical development diesel application, Volkswagen AG, was one of the engineers that worked on the AdBlue system created by Volkswagen, BMW, and Mercedes-Benz. Kuiken talked about the difference between the VW Touareg diesel and gasoline vehicles.

Touareg "Lux Limited" (2009)
The Touareg "Lux Limited" is a version of the V6 TDI Clean Diesel (225PS), V6 FSI, and V8 FSI for the US market. It features 20-inch alloy wheels ("Mountain" type) with size 275 all-season tires and a choice of 4 body colours (Sapphire Blue, Black Magic Pearl, Campanella White, and Galapagos Gray). It also came equipped with a full body colour aerodynamics kit, dual power front seats, full Cricket two-tone leather interior, touch screen navigation with streaming Bluetooth audio, 320-watt 11-speaker audio system, and adaptive high-intensity discharge headlamps.

The vehicle was unveiled at the 2009 NAIAS.

Touareg V6 TSI Hybrid (2009)
The electric motor is powered by a 240-cell, 288 V, 6 Ah nickel metal-hydride battery array. The 4motion four-wheel drive system utilised a lighter Torsen centre differential from the Audi Q7 to save weight. Start-stop system supports regenerative braking, and coasting. Power steering and air conditioning were changed to be powered by battery.

The planned production version included a special E-switch that the driver can activate for pure electric driving,  coasting speed.

Engines
US models include 3.6 V6, 4.2 V8, BlueMotion 3.0 VR6 TDI. Canada models include 3.6 V6, BlueMotion 3.0 V6 TDI.
BlueMotion 3.0 V6 TDI was sold as V6 TDI Clean Diesel in US and Canada.

Transmissions

Marketing
In Canada and the US, ads showed the Touareg capable of feats that other Volkswagen cars could not accomplish, such as going right through a snowbank while a New Beetle got stuck.

A 2007 Volkswagen Touareg V10 TDI pulled a Boeing 747 as part of an advertising campaign, which holds the world record for the heaviest load towed by a passenger car.

In 2007 Día de los Innocents, Volkswagen Spain's website, showed a fake Touareg Cabrio convertible. The site was registered to VW's Spanish division.

As part of the Touareg 2 launch campaign coinciding with the premier of The Bourne Ultimatum movie, Volkswagen launched an interactive stunt simulator that allowed fans to play out their own stunts online. Users could maneuver any of six different VW models through various explosions, while altering vehicle speeds, props, sound effects, and camera angles to make that perfect scene.

Second generation (7P; 2010)

The second generation (Typ 7P) Touareg was revealed on February 10, 2010, in Munich and later at the 2010 Beijing International Auto Show.

The new Touareg features a world-first automotive headlight technology: the "Dynamic Light Assist" glare-free high beam. Unlike an adaptive high-beam system, the Dynamic Light Assist system continually and gradually adjusts not only the high-beam range but also its pattern. The beam pattern changes its direction continually so that vehicles in front are not being illuminated, while the area surrounding them is being constantly illuminated at high beam intensity.

Features
Adaptive cruise control with new Stop & Go function
Lane departure warning system: Lane Assist
Blind Spot Monitor: Side Assist
Front Assist Collision avoidance system for front (with full automatic emergency braking)
Area View with four cameras
Adaptive Air Suspension with continuous damping control (CDC) and Adaptive Body Roll Compensation
Standard Aisin eight-speed automatic transmission

Touareg Hybrid (2010–2018)

The vehicle was unveiled at the 2010 Geneva Motor Show and later at the 2010 New York International Auto Show and the 2010 Guangzhou Auto Show.

The Chinese model went on sale in early 2011.

Touareg Exclusive (2010-2018)
The Touareg Exclusive is a version of the Touareg that features seats with a two-tone leather combination "Nappa" upholstery in 2 colour combinations (Pepper Beige–Titan Black, Dark Burgundy–Titan Black). It also comes with heated front seats with electric 12-way settings, leather door inserts, a black headliner, and sill panel strips in stainless steel with exclusive lettering. Decorative elements made from real wood in "Olive Silk Gloss", 19-inch "Salamanca" alloy wheels in Sterling Silver (no-cost optional 19-inch Girona wheel, optional 20-inch "Tarragona" wheel), Chrome & Style package and roof rails in anodised silver.

Race Touareg 3
The Race Touareg 3 is a race car built for the 2011 Dakar Rally, replacing the Race Touareg 2.

2011 Qatar Motor Show concepts (2011)
The Race Touareg 3 Qatar is a concept car based on the Race Touareg 3 but adapted for street use. It includes BBS 18-inch gold wheels, Serpentino Grey Metallic safety cage, Recaro racing bucket seats, Matt Carbon interior trim, "Black" and "Pure Grey" Nubuk leather upholstery at seat side supports and the door trim panels, Titan Black Nappa leather-upholstered centre seat panels, two-tone seams and silver piping on the seat covers and safety-related items painted in Tornado Red.

The Touareg Gold Edition is based on the Touareg with a 4.2 V8 FSI engine. It includes custom-designed 22-inch wheels, roof rails, protective guard strips and window frames, mirror caps and parts of the air intake frame, "Magic Morning" body colour, 24-carat gold accents and switches, "Luna" interior trim colour, Luna Alcantara roof liner and Nappa leather seats, natural brown leather dashboard with Magnolia seams and floor mats in Natural brown with leather inserts in "Luna."

The vehicles were unveiled at the 2011 Qatar Motor Show.

Touareg X (2013-2014)
The Touareg X is a limited (1000 units) version of the 2014 Touareg TDI Clean Diesel Lux (240PS) with a 4MOTION all-wheel-drive system for the US market, commemorating the 10th anniversary of the Volkswagen Touareg. It includes unique 19-inch 'Moab' aluminum-alloy wheels, Moonlight Blue Pearl body colour, LED taillight, Touareg X-specific badging, Vienna leather seating surfaces in Black Anthracite, a complementing black headliner, a panoramic powered sunroof, keyless access with push-button start, bi-xenon headlights with LED Daytime Running Lights, front fog- and cornering lights, RNS 850 navigation system with an eight-inch color touchscreen, 60GB hard drive, and rearview camera; Bluetooth technology, Climatronic dual-zone air conditioning, 12-way powered and heated front seats with driver seat memory and power adjustable lumbar and a leather-wrapped multifunction steering wheel.

Engines

Marketing
As part of the Touareg product launch in China, a 3-part, 15-minute total movie named A Journey Beyond (锐·享征程) was produced. The movie was produced by DDB Guoan, and directed by Lu Chuan. The film itself was nominated as a finalist in the China Longxi awards under the FILM – Craft: Best editing category.

As part of National Museum of China sponsorship, Touareg Hybrid vehicles were offered as a free shuttle service – named "Museum Hopping" – between the National Museum, the Palace Museum, and the National Art Museum.

2015 facelift

For the model year 2016, the Touareg 7P was given a face-lift. Changes included:
Standard bi-xenon headlights
Automatic Post-Collision Braking System
Upgraded adaptive cruise control
V6 TDI engine with 
Improved standard steel-spring suspension
Availability of online services: point-of-Interest search via Google, maps provided by Google Earth, a Google Street View function and traffic reporting.

Safety
The Insurance Institute for Highway Safety crash-tested the Touareg, and presented the following results (ratings from 'poor' to 'good'):

Third generation (CR; 2018)

The third generation Touareg was revealed on March 23, 2018. It emphasises fuel efficiency. VW discontinued the Touareg for sale in North America from the 2017 model year onward based on sales and the availability of the larger and less expensive Atlas (sold as the Teramont outside of the United States, Canada, and Chile) which was specifically designed for the United States. The vehicle is larger and uses the Volkswagen Group MLB platform shared with the corporate siblings, the Porsche Cayenne and Audi Q7.

Touareg R PHEV 
In February 2020, Volkswagen revealed the Touareg R plug-in hybrid variant. The powertrain combines a  V6 turbocharged petrol engine, a  electric motor, and a 14.1 kWh lithium-ion battery pack.

Motorsports
A modified Touareg dubbed Stanley won the 2005 DARPA Grand Challenge.

Pikes Peak
VW Touareg TDI entered the 85th running of the Pikes Peak International Hill Climb, with V10 TDI Touaregs and a V6 TDI Touareg, driven by Ryan Arciero, Mike Miller, and Chris Blais. Arciero won the race with a time of 13:17:703 setting a new division record for the fastest time with a diesel powered vehicle. Miller finished second with a time of 13:25:247. Chris Blais finished third with a time of 15:48:312.

Baja 500
The 2.5L R5 TDI won a 2007 Baja 500 class with drivers Mark Miller/Ralph Pitchford (USA/South Africa).

Baja 1000
It uses a mid-engine, rear-wheel drive layout. The chassis and body were designed by Arciero Miller Racing and Volkswagen Design Center California respectively.

The vehicle was unveiled at the 2008 LA Auto Show.

The Race Touareg TDI Trophy Truck completed the 41st Annual Tecate SCORE Baja 1000 race with 13th position for Trophy Truck Class. The vehicle was driven by Mark Miller.

Dakar Rally

In the 2003 Dakar Rally, Volkswagen entered a team of rear-wheel drive Tarek buggies. VW claimed sixth overall, driven by Stephane Henrard and co-driver Bobby Willis. In the following year, the 2004 Dakar Rally saw the debut rally for the T2 class, built Race Touareg by Volkswagen Motorsport. Bruno Saby and co driver Matthew Stevenson claimed sixth position overall. In the 2005 Dakar Rally, Jutta Kleinschmidt and co-driver Fabrizia Pons claimed third spot overall in the Race Touareg.

In the 2006 Dakar Rally, Volkswagen driver Giniel de Villiers and co-driver Tina Thörner claimed the second spot, the highest ever for a diesel model in the new Race Touareg 2. It has a shorter wheelbase than the original Race Touareg, as well as increased visibility.  For the 2007 Dakar Rally, VW driver Mark Miller and Ralph Pitchford drove the Race Touareg 2 to 4th position overall. In the 2008 Central Europe Rally, Carlos Sainz drove his Race Touareg 2 to victory. Finally, in the 2009 edition of Rally Dakar, Volkswagen achieved a one-two result. Giniel de Villiers and co driver Dirk von Zitzewitz won the race ahead of Mark Miller and Ralph Pitchford. With just two days to go, Carlos Sainz crashed out after dominating the rally for several days, thus preventing Volkswagen from making it a one-two-three result.

Carlos Sainz won in 2010 with a 1-2-3 finish, and Nasser Al-Attiyah won for VW in 2011.

A 1/32 slot car model of the Red Bull-sponsored Touareg, which is designed to run on the company's RAID track (which simulates off-road racing), is available from Ninco.

Power Output: VW Dakar Racers
2007 Race-Touareg 2 (T2 spec) 2.5 TDI 285 hp/209 kW
2006 Race-Touareg 2 (T2 spec) 2.5 TDI 275 hp/202 kW
2005 Race-Touareg (T2 spec) 2.5 TDI 260 hp/191 kW
2004 Race-Touareg (T2 spec) 2.3 TDI 231 hp/170 kW
2003 Tarek 1.9 TDI 218 hp/160 kW

Cape to Cape
On September 20, 2015, a Touareg V6 TDI driven by Rainer Zietlow, Marius Biela, and Sam Roach completed the run of 19,000 km from Cape Agulhas, the southernmost point of Africa, to the North Cape (Nordkapp) of Norway in a world record time of 9 days, 4 hours, 9 minutes and 27 seconds.

The  V6 TDI engine and other mechanical parts such as gearbox and drive shafts were standard.

Awards
The Touareg was Car and Driver magazine's Best Luxury SUV for 2003, Motor Trend magazine's Sport/Utility of the Year for 2004, "Four Wheeler" magazine's Four Wheeler of the Year for 2005, and Overlander's 2003 4WDOTY.

Sales

References

Touareg
Cars introduced in 2002
2010s cars
2020s cars
Mid-size sport utility vehicles
Luxury crossover sport utility vehicles
All-wheel-drive vehicles
Euro NCAP large off-road
Hybrid electric vehicles
Cars powered by VR engines
Flagship vehicles